The Leonardo numbers are a sequence of numbers given by the recurrence:

Edsger W. Dijkstra used them as an integral part of his smoothsort algorithm,  and also analyzed them in some detail. 

A Leonardo prime is a Leonardo number that's also prime.

Values
The first Leonardo numbers are
1, 1, 3, 5, 9, 15, 25, 41, 67, 109, 177, 287, 465, 753, 1219, 1973, 3193, 5167, 8361, ... 

The only Leonardo primes are
3, 5, 41, 67, 109, 1973, 5167, 2692537, 11405773, 126491971, 331160281, 535828591, 279167724889, 145446920496281, 28944668049352441, 5760134388741632239, 63880869269980199809, 167242286979696845953, 597222253637954133837103, ...

Modulo cycles
The Leonardo numbers form a cycle in any modulo n≥2. An easy way to see it is:
 If a pair of numbers modulo n appears twice in the sequence, then there's a cycle.
 If we assume the main statement is false, using the previous statement, then it would imply there's infinite distinct pairs of numbers between 0 and n-1, which is false since there are n2 such pairs.
The cycles for n≤8 are:

The cycle always end on the pair (1,n-1), as it's the only pair which can precede the pair (1,1).

Expressions
The following equation applies:

Relation to Fibonacci numbers
The Leonardo numbers are related to the Fibonacci numbers by the relation .

From this relation it is straightforward to derive a closed-form expression for the Leonardo numbers, analogous to Binet's formula for the Fibonacci numbers:

References

External links
 

Integer sequences
Fibonacci numbers
Recurrence relations